The Menominee North Pier lighthouse is located in the harbor of Menominee, Michigan. The station was first lit in 1877.  The current structure and its still operational light was lit in 1927, and automated in 1972.  It is also sometimes called the "Menominee (Marinette) North Pierhead Light".

The foundation is a concrete pier. A Fourth Order Fresnel lens was originally installed, but was replaced with a modern  acrylic optic lens. The original lens is now at Sand Point Light in Escanaba, Michigan.

The building originally had a diaphone fog signal structure attached, and it was later removed.  The iron catwalk was removed in 1972 when the light was automated.

This light is paired with a large rear range light. That is denominated the  Menominee (Marinette) North Pier light, and is also an active aid to navigation. Its focal plane , and its characteristic is a continuous red light. The tower is a square pyramidal steel skeletal tower with gallery. It may be accessed by walking the pier. The site is open, but the tower is closed. U.S. Coast Guard. USCG 7-21940.

References

External links

 Detroit News, Interactive map on Michigan lighthouses.
 Interactive map of Lights in Northern Lake Michigan, mapped by Google.
 Lighthouse Central, Menominee North Pier Light, The Ultimate Guide to Upper Michigan Lighthouses by Jerry Roach.. (Publisher: Bugs Publishing LLC - 2007).  .
 

Lighthouses completed in 1877
Lighthouses completed in 1927
Buildings and structures in Menominee County, Michigan
Lighthouses on the National Register of Historic Places in Michigan
Tourist attractions in Menominee County, Michigan
National Register of Historic Places in Menominee County, Michigan
1877 establishments in Michigan